Blind Desire (French: La Part de l'ombre) is a 1945 French drama film directed by Jean Delannoy and starring Edwige Feuillère.

It was also known as La part de l'ombre.

It earned admissions in France of 1,913,192.

References

External links
Blind Desire at IMDb

1945 films
Films directed by Jean Delannoy
1940s French-language films
1945 drama films
French drama films
French black-and-white films
1940s French films